TUV may refer to:

 Tuvalu, a South Pacific island nation
 Technischer Überwachungsverein (TÜV), a German safety monitoring agency
 Vienna University of Technology (Technische Universität Wien)
 Traditional Unionist Voice, a Northern Irish political party in favour of union with Great Britain
 Mahindra TUV 300, an Indian SUV manufactured by Mahindra & Mahindra